Al-Murassas, was a Palestinian Arab village in the District of Baysan. It was depopulated by the Israel Defense Forces during the 1948 War on May 16, 1948. The village was attacked as part of Operation Gideon.

History
In 1596 Al-Murassas was a farm paying taxes to the Ottoman authorities.

Johann Ludwig Burckhardt mentions passing the village  (which he called Meraszrasz) during his travels in the early 19th century.

In 1838, el-Murussus was noted as part of the Jenin District.

In 1882 the PEF's Survey of Western Palestine (SWP) described the it as "A small village on high ground, entirely
built of mud, and standing amid plough-land. The water supply appears to come from the valley beneath (Wady Yebla)."

British Mandate era
In  the 1922 census of Palestine, conducted by the  Mandatory Palestine authorities,  Murassas had a population of 319 Muslims, increasing in the 1931 census to  381; 375  Muslims and 6 Christians, in a total of  89  houses.

The village had a population of 460 in  the 1945 statistics; 450 Muslims and 10 Christians,  while the total land area was 14,477  dunams.  Of this, Arabs used 16 dunums  for plantations and irrigable land, 9,897  for cereals, while 16 dunums were classified built–up (urban) land.

1948, aftermath
On June 6, 1948, a platoon from the Israeli Barak brigade raided Danna, Al-Bira, Kafra, Yubla,  Jabbul and Al-Murassas. They would first fire “a few two-inch mortar rounds into its centre,“  then move in. Al-Murassas was found to be empty.  The destruction of Al-Murassas  was later criticised by a  veteran local Israeli leader, who thought that the villagers  would have been willing to cooperate with the Yishuv and  “allocate part of their lands for our settlements.“

In July, 1948, The Israeli kibbutz   Beit HaShita   took over 5,400 dunams of land from the newly depopulated Palestinian villages of Yubla and Al-Murassas.

In 1992 the village site was described: The village site is part of an agricultural area that is exploited by the settlements of Sde Nachum and Beyt ha-Shitta. The only structures on the area are telephone poles and a small shed. A small tell on the site, surrounded by plowed fields, is littered with rubble."

References

Bibliography

External links
Welcome To al-Murassas
al-Murassas, Zochrot 
Survey of Western Palestine, Map 9: IAA, Wikimedia commons 

Arab villages depopulated during the 1948 Arab–Israeli War